Ilion (before 1994: Νέα Λιόσια, Nea Liosia) is a suburb in west Athens, Greece. With 85,000 inhabitants (2011), it is one of the largest suburbs of Athens.

Geography
The municipality has an area of 9.453 km2. Neighbouring municipalities are Agioi Anargyroi-Kamatero to the north and east, Petroupoli to the northwest and Peristeri to the south. The main streets are Fylis Avenue, Thivon Avenue, Idomeneos Street and Protesilaou Street.

Sites of interest
National Sports Center of Nea Liosia
Environmental Awareness Park "Antonis Tritsis"
Forklore Museum
Cultural Center

Historical population

Sports
Ilion hosts many athletic clubs in several sports. Μost of them play in the amateur divisions. Presence or earlier presence in the higher divisions in their sport have the clubs Olympiakos Neon Liosion and Enosi Iliou.

International relations
Ilion, Greece is twinned with:
 Corigliano d'Otranto, Italy
 Tulcea, Romania
 Armilla, Spain
 Jericho, Palestine

References

External links
September 1999 earthquake in Nea Liosia
 Municipality of Ilion
  From Nea Liosia to Ilion

Municipalities of Attica
Populated places in West Athens (regional unit)